The 2002–03 Swedish Figure Skating Championships were held in Uddevalla from December 6 through 8, 2002. Because they were held in December, they were officially designated by the Swedish federation as the 2002 Swedish Championships, but the champions are the 2003 Swedish Champions. Skaters competed in the disciplines of men's and ladies' singles, with the results among the selection criteria for the 2003 World Championships, the 2003 European Championships, and the 2003 World Junior Championships.

Senior results

Men

Ladies

External links
 results

2002 in figure skating
2003 in figure skating
Swedish Figure Skating Championships
Figure Skating Championships
Figure Skating Championships
Sports competitions in Uddevalla